The 1992 World Field Archery Championships were held in Margraten, Netherlands.

Medal summary (Men's individual)

Medal summary (Women's individual)

Medal summary (Men's Team)

Medal summary (Women's Team)

Medal summary (Juniors)
No Junior Events at this championships.

References

E
1992 in Dutch sport
International archery competitions hosted by the Netherlands
World Field Archery Championships